Nucleoporin 93 (Nup93) is a protein that in humans is encoded by the NUP93 gene.

References

Further reading

External links 
 PDBe-KB provides an overview of all the structure information available in the PDB for Human Nuclear pore complex protein Nup93

Nuclear pore complex